Estigmene albida is a species of moth in the family Erebidae. It was described by Richard Harper Stretch in 1874. It is found in the United States from Montana to South Dakota, south to New Mexico and Arizona. It is also found in Mexico, Costa Rica and Guatemala.

The wingspan is about 50 mm.

References

Spilosomina
Moths described in 1874